Rosazza is a comune in the Province of Biella, Piedmont, Italy.

It may also refer to:
Joan Rosazza (born 1937), American swimmer
Peter A. Rosazza (born 1935), American prelate of the Roman Catholic Church
Villa Di Negro Rosazza dello Scoglietto, a villa located in the quarter of San Teodoro in Genoa, Italy

Italian-language surnames